The Order of Merit is a Chilean order and was created in 1929. Succeeding the Medal of the Merit, which was created during the term of the President Germán Riesco through the Minister of War decree No. 1350 on 4 September 1906. This new national distinction was created to recognize the meritorious service provided by foreign military personnel to Chilean officials. The order is only awarded to foreigners.

History 

In 1817, Bernardo O'Higgins created the Legion of Merit, with the aim of recognizing the ones who have provided help to Chile, specially during its independence. In 1823, when O'Higgins fled the country after his abdication, the Legion was extinct.

Nevertheless, in 1906, Germán Riesco created the Medal of the Merit, with the same aim as the current Order: award those who gave civil services to the Republic. The first 200 military medals were minted in gold and silver, giving them the title of First and Second Class.  They were minted at the Casa de la Moneda, having a tricolor ribbon. The order had three classes: First, Second, and Third Class; but later a new class was added (Grand Officer) that would be awarded to heads of state.

In 1929, the Medal was renamed as the Order of Merit, and the current regulations where enacted in 2000, being slightly reformed in 2016.

Grades 

The President of Chile is the Gran Master of the Order. The Chancellor is the minister of Foreign Affairs.

 Collar
 Grand Cross
 Grand Officer
 Commander
 Officer
 Knight

Insignia 

The Orders design is made up of a gold five-pointed star enamelled in while, backed by a gold laurel wreath. The central disc bears a representation of the national personification of Chile. The outer ring of the central disk is inscribed with "Republica de Chile" (Republic of Chile). The badge hangs from a gold Andean Condor, the national bird of Chile. The Star of the Grand Cross grade is made up of a ten-pointed highly curved star fronted by a gold laurel wreath. Placed on this is another five-pointed white-enamelled star with a central gold disc. The outer edge of the disc is enamelled in blue with the inscription; "Orden del Merito Chile" (Order of Merit Chile). The centre of the disc is emblazoned with a representation of the Coat of Arms of Chile. The badge of the Order is the same for the Collar, Grand Cross, Grand Officer and Commander grades, however the final two grades; the Officer and Knight, are the same basic design however instead of being enamelled in white, the star is enamelled in blue and red respectively. The Orders ribbon is made up of a blue field edged very thinly in red. This is the reverse of the ribbon for the other Chilean order of chivalry; The Order of Bernardo O'Higgins.

Recipients 

 Wilhelm Adam (colonel general)
 Konrad Adenauer
 Martti Ahtisaari
 Jorge Alessandri
 José Arce
 Henry H. Arnold
 Patricio Aylwin 

 Michelle Bachelet 
 Leszek Balcerowicz
 Andrew Bertie
 Bhumibol Adulyadej

 Rafael Caldera
 Felipe Calderón
 Prince Carl Philip, Duke of Värmland
 Horacio Cartes
 Aníbal Cavaco Silva
 Fernando Collor 
 António Costa 
 Carlos Manuel de Céspedes y Quesada 

 Eduard Dietl
 Osvaldo Dorticós Torrado 

 Willem Anton Engelbrecht

 Matthew Festing 
 Frederik, Crown Prince of Denmark 
 Eduardo Frei Montalva 

 Narciso Garay
 Prince George, Duke of Kent
 Władysław Günther-Schwarzburg 
 António Guterres
 Christian Günther 

 William Halsey, Jr.
 Miklós Horthy 

 Ted Kennedy 
 Aleksander Kwaśniewski 

 Luis Alberto Lacalle
 José Antonio de Lavalle y García 
 Curtis LeMay
 Maurice August Lippens

 Joseph Taggart McNarney 
 George Marshall 
 Queen Máxima of the Netherlands
 Zoran Milanović
 Ignacy Mościcki 

 Valentín Paniagua
 Aleksandra Piątkowska
 Augusto Pinochet 
 Koča Popović
 Miguel Primo de Rivera 

 Mariano Rajoy 
 Kazimierz Raszewski 
 Marcelo Rebelo de Sousa 
 Nelson Rockefeller 
 Karol Adam Romer

 Jorge Sampaio 
 Julio María Sanguinetti
 José Serrato
 Birendra Bir Bikram Shah Dev 
 Krzysztof Skubiszewski 

 Frans Timmermans (politician)
 Alejandro Toledo
 Rafael Leónidas Trujillo 
 Franjo Tuđman

 Victoria, Crown Princess of Sweden

 Willem-Alexander of the Netherlands
 Elizabeth II of the United Kingdom

 August Zaleski
 Arthur Zimmermann
 Mizan Zainal Abidin of Terengganu

References and links 

 Condecoraciones, Ministerio de Relaciones Exteriores de Chile.

Orders, decorations, and medals of Chile
1929 establishments in Chile
Merit of Chile, Order of the
Orders of merit
Awards established in 1929